Salt River Township is an inactive township in Pike County, in the U.S. state of Missouri.

Salt River Township was erected in 1820, taking its name from the Salt River.

References

Townships in Missouri
Townships in Pike County, Missouri